The Vadi language, Tsuvadi, is a Kainji language of Nigeria spoken by the Kambari people.

Kakihum (or Gadi, Gaɗi), is a dialect.

References

Kambari languages
Languages of Nigeria